Paul Ellison (born October 17, 1941) is co-principal bass at the Grand Teton Festivals, and is Professor of Double Bass at Rice University's Shepherd School of Music.  He was also on the faculty of The Colburn School Conservatory of Music in Los Angeles, California.

Mr. Ellison enjoyed 23 years as principal bass of the Houston Symphony Orchestra, several years as principal double bass of the Santa Fe Opera, and seven years as chair of strings at the University of Southern California.  His college degrees include a B.M.E. (1965) Eastern New Mexico University and an M.M. (1966) Northwestern University.  He also makes annual appearances at the Royal College of Music, London, the Yehudi Menuhin School of Music and Caroline Emery's annual Bass Club Summer School, where students have the benefit of his experience to help them achieve a pathway to the musical profession.

With former students holding prominent positions in orchestras and schools worldwide, Ellison holds the first Diploma and Teaching Certificate awarded by the Institute Rabbath in Paris and is past president of the International Society of Bassists.  Paul Ellison continues to be a great influence in the realm of string pedagogy as he influences young players internationally travelling to Australia, England, France, and throughout the United States. See the Australian String Academy for an example.

Notable students and associates
 Sébastien Dubé
 Hal Robinson

External links 
 Paul Ellison bass workshop in Australia
 http://www.music.rice.edu/facultybios/ellison.shtml
 http://doublebassblog.org/2007/06/advice-from-paul-ellison-professor-of-double-bass-rice-university.html

Classical double-bassists
Texas classical music
Musicians from Santa Fe, New Mexico
Eastern New Mexico University alumni
Bienen School of Music alumni
USC Thornton School of Music faculty
Rice University faculty
Living people
1941 births
21st-century double-bassists